Matthew David Buschmann (born February 13, 1984) is an American former professional baseball pitcher. He played in Major League Baseball (MLB) in 2016 for the Arizona Diamondbacks. He served as the bullpen coach for the Toronto Blue Jays from 2019 to 2022.

Amateur career
Buschmann attended Lafayette High School in Wildwood, Missouri, and then Vanderbilt University, where he played college baseball for the Vanderbilt Commodores primarily as a relief pitcher his first three seasons. He was 5–2 with 5 saves and a 3.86 ERA as a freshman at Vanderbilt in 2003 and participated in a combined perfect game in May, then 8–1 with 2 saves and a 2.84 ERA as a sophomore in 2004. He helped lead the team to the 2004 Southeastern Conference baseball tournament finals, though the club was beaten by South Carolina. After the 2004 season, he played collegiate summer baseball with the Hyannis Mets of the Cape Cod Baseball League. In 2005, he was 4–3 with a 3.47 ERA and a save. In his senior year, 2006, Buschmann was 3–3 with a 4.27 ERA in 7 starts. Overall, he was 20–9 with a 3.50 ERA in 79 games (26 starts) in his four-year collegiate career. He helped lead Vanderbilt to the 2006 Southeastern Conference baseball tournament, with the team losing to Ole Miss in the finals. He was also named to the SEC Baseball Good Works Team that year.

Professional career
Buschmann was drafted in the 15th round of the 2006 amateur draft by the San Diego Padres, was signed by scout Ash Lawson, and began his professional career that year. He split the summer between the Eugene Emeralds and Lake Elsinore Storm, going a combined 4–4 with a 3.19 ERA in 17 games (12 starts). With the Storm again in 2007, he was 12–6 with a 2.89 ERA in 28 games (25 starts). He was California League Post-Season All-Star and earned two Pitcher of the Week honors that season. In 2008, he was 10–6 with a 2.98 ERA in 27 starts for the San Antonio Missions and earned a spot on the Texas League's Mid- and Post-Season All-Star squads. He was, according to The Baseball Cube, the best pitcher in the league that season.

The pitcher dropped to 5–11 with a 5.66 ERA in 35 games (21 starts) in 2009, split between the Missions and Triple-A Portland Beavers. In his first trial at Triple-A, he was 3–10 with a 6.18 ERA. In 2010, Buschmann was 2–6 with a 5.01 ERA in 40 games (9 starts) between the Missions and Beavers. He had 94 strikeouts in 91.2 innings that year, the first time in his career he averaged more than a strikeout per inning. In 2011, he was 12–6 with a 6.16 ERA in 32 games (22 starts) between San Antonio and the Tucson Padres, San Diego's new Triple-A club.

The Washington Nationals selected him in the Double-A portion of the Rule 5 Draft, though the team traded him to the Tampa Bay Rays for cash considerations in April 2012. He pitched for the Montgomery Biscuits and Triple-A Durham Bulls in 2012 and went 7–8 with a 3.98 ERA in 26 games (24 starts). In May, he earned a Southern League Pitcher of the Week honor. With Montgomery and Durham again in 2013, he went 14–5 with a 2.86 ERA in 29 games (28 starts), striking out 167 batters in 160.2 innings. He became a free-agent following the 2013 campaign and signed with the Oakland Athletics. He went 10–7 with a 4.40 ERA in 25 games (24 starts) for the Sacramento River Cats; he also had 134 strikeouts in 143.1 innings. He re-signed with Oakland for 2015, but was traded to the Tampa Bay Rays for cash before the season began. After posting a 6–5 record with a 3.89 ERA for the Durham Bulls, he was released in June and signed by the Cincinnati Reds. He started nine games for the Louisville Bats and went 2–5 with a 4.25 ERA. On August 11, he was traded to the Baltimore Orioles for cash and made one start for the Norfolk Tides, their Triple-A club. He was 8–10 with a 4.08 ERA in 23 starts that year. In August of that year, he was a guest columnist for ESPN.com, penning an article called "What baseball might look like in the year 2045." Adam Sobsey of Grantland.com wrote a feature piece on Buschmann in August, as well, asking "will the minor league strikeout king ever reach the majors?" He became a free agent following the season and signed with the Arizona Diamondbacks for 2016. He earned an invitation to major league spring training.

On April 7, 2016, Buschmann was promoted to the major leagues for the first time after pitcher Kyle Drabek was designated for assignment. He made his major league debut on April 10, 2016, facing the Chicago Cubs. He pitched a scoreless top of the ninth inning, allowing only a base hit to Munenori Kawasaki. Buschmann was designated for assignment on April 29, and outrighted to Triple-A Reno on May 3.

In March 2017, Buschmann signed a minor league contract with the Toronto Blue Jays, and was assigned to the Triple-A Buffalo Bisons. He did not appear in any games for the Bisons in 2017.

Post-playing career

San Francisco Giants
On December 17, 2017, Buschmann was hired by the San Francisco Giants organization as an assistant director of player development.

Toronto Blue Jays
On November 26, 2018, Buschmann was hired by the Toronto Blue Jays as their bullpen coach.

Buschmann caught Aaron Judge's AL record-tying 61st home run while working the bullpen for the Toronto Blue Jays.

After four years in the role, on January 15, 2023, Buschmann left the Blue Jays organization to pursue other opportunities. He had also served as director of pitching development since 2020.

Personal life
Buschmann is married to sportscaster Sara Walsh. David Price, a former teammate of Buschmann's, was the "matchmaker." On February 3, 2017, Buschmann announced the birth of twins, Hutton and Brees.

See also
Rule 5 draft results

References

External links

1984 births
Living people
American expatriate baseball people in Canada
Arizona Diamondbacks players
Baseball coaches from Missouri
Baseball players from St. Louis
Durham Bulls players
Eugene Emeralds players
Hyannis Harbor Hawks players
Lake Elsinore Storm players
Louisville Bats players
Major League Baseball bullpen coaches
Major League Baseball pitchers
Minor league baseball coaches
Montgomery Biscuits players
Norfolk Tides players
Portland Beavers players
Reno Aces players
Sacramento River Cats players
San Antonio Missions players
Stockton Ports players
Tomateros de Culiacán players
American expatriate baseball players in Mexico
Toronto Blue Jays coaches
Tucson Padres players
Vanderbilt Commodores baseball players
Venados de Mazatlán players